Sergei Fyodorovich Bondarchuk  (25 September 192020 October 1994) was a Soviet and Russian actor, film director, and screenwriter of Ukrainian, Bulgarian and Serbian origin who was one of the leading figures of Russian cinema of the 1950s, 1960s and 1970s. He is known for his sweeping period dramas, including the internationally acclaimed four-part adaptation of Leo Tolstoy's War and Peace and the Napoleonic War epic Waterloo.

Bondarchuk's work won him numerous international accolades. His epic production of Tolstoy's War and Peace won Bondarchuk, who both directed and acted in the leading role of Pierre Bezukhov, the Golden Globe Award for Best Foreign Language Film (1968), and the Academy Award for Best Foreign Language Film in 1968. He was made both a Hero of Socialist Labour and a People's Artist of the USSR.

Early life 
Sergey Bondarchuk was born in the village of Bilozerka (now in Kherson Raion, Kherson Oblast of Ukraine) on September 25, 1920 in the family of peasants Fyodor Petrovich and Tatyana Vasilievna (nee Tokarenko). The paternal grandfather was ethnically Bulgarian Pyotr Konstantinovich Bondarchuk, the grandmother was ethnically Serbian Matryona Fyodorovna Sirvulya. At the time of childbirth, the father was serving in the Red Army, the mother, being a deeply religious person, named her son in honor of Sergius of Radonezh and baptized him in the Annunciation Monastery near Kherson. Sergei Bondarchuk spent his childhood in the cities of Yeysk and Taganrog, graduating from the Taganrog School Number 4 in 1938. His first performance as an actor was onstage of the Taganrog Theatre in 1937. He continued studies in the Rostov-on-Don theater school (1938–1942). After his studies, he was conscripted into the Red Army during World War II against Nazi Germany. He was decorated for his courage in battles and was discharged with honors in 1946.

Film career 
In 1948, Bondarchuk made his film debut in The Young Guard directed by Sergei Gerasimov. In 1952, he was awarded the Stalin Prize for the leading role in the film Taras Shevchenko. At the age of 32, he became the youngest Soviet actor ever to receive the top dignity of People's Artist of the USSR. In 1955, he starred with his future wife Irina Skobtseva in Othello. In 1959, he made his directorial debut with Fate of a Man, based on Mikhail Sholokhov's short story of the same name. The film was internationally acclaimed upon its release.

Bondarchuk earned international fame with his epic production of Tolstoy's War and Peace, which on original release totaled more than seven hours of cinema, took six years to complete and won Bondarchuk, who both directed and acted the role of Pierre Bezukhov, the Academy Award for Best Foreign Language Film in 1968. The year after his victory, in 1969, he starred as Martin with Yul Brynner and Orson Welles in the Yugoslav epic Battle of Neretva, directed by Veljko Bulajic.

His first English-language film was 1970's Waterloo, produced by Dino De Laurentiis. In Europe, the critics called it remarkable for the epic battle scenes and details in capturing the Napoleonic era. However, it failed at the box office. To prevent running into hurdles with the Soviet government, he joined the Communist Party in 1970. A year later, he was appointed president of the Union of Cinematographers, while he continued his directing career, steering toward political films, directing Boris Godunov before being dismissed from the semi-governmental post in 1986.

In 1973, he was the president of the Jury at the 8th Moscow International Film Festival.

In 1975, he directed They Fought for Their Country, which was entered into the 1975 Cannes Film Festival. In 1982 came Red Bells, based on John Reed's Ten Days That Shook the World (which serves as the film's alternative title). His 1986 film Boris Godunov was also screened at Cannes that year.

Bondarchuk's last feature film, and his second in English, was an epic TV version of Sholokhov's And Quiet Flows the Don, starring Rupert Everett. It was filmed in 1992–1993 but premiered on Channel One only in November 2006, as there were disputes concerning the Italian studio that was co-producing over unfavorable clauses in his contract, which left the tapes locked in a bank vault. After his death, the film remained locked for several years until it was recovered and released in 2006.

In 1995, he was posthumously awarded an honorable diploma for contribution to cinema at the 19th Moscow International Film Festival.

Personal life
He first married Inna Makarova, mother to his oldest daughter, Natalya Bondarchuk (born 1950). Natalya is remembered for her role in Andrei Tarkovsky's 1972 film Solaris.

He met his second wife Irina Skobtseva when both were appearing in Othello, and they married in 1959. They had two children, actress Yelena Bondarchuk (1962–2009) and a son Fyodor (born 1967), (who starred with him in Boris Godunov), a popular Russian film actor and director best known for his box-office hit The 9th Company (2005).

Death
Sergei Bondarchuk died on October 20, 1994 at the age of 74 in Moscow from myocardial infarction. Before his death, he was confessed and given communion by Hieromonk Tikhon (Shevkunov). He is buried in the Novodevichy Cemetery, Moscow. In June 2007, his ex-wife Inna Makarova unveiled a bronze statue of Bondarchuk in his native Yeysk.

Honours and awards
 Stalin Prize, 1st class (1952) – for the main role in the film Taras Shevchenko and the role of Sergei Tutarinov in Knight of the Golden Star (1950)
 Lenin Prize (1960) – for the film The Destiny of Man (1959)
 Golden Globe Award for Best Foreign Language Film (1968) – for the film War and Peace
 Academy Award for Best Foreign Language Film (1968) – for the film War and Peace
 Vasilyev Brothers State Prize of the RSFSR (1977) – for the film They Fought for Their Country
 Hero of Socialist Labour (1980)
 Shevchenko National Prize (1982) – for his performance as Cardinal Montanelli in the film The Gadfly (1980)
 USSR State Prize (1984) – for the film Red Bells
 Order of Lenin, twice
 Order of the October Revolution
 Order of the Patriotic War, 2nd class
 Order of the Red Banner of Labour
 Honored Artist of the RSFSR (1951)
 People's Artist of the USSR (1952)

Filmography

Writer
 Battle of Sutjeska (1973)

References

External links

 
 
 War and Peace of Sergei Bondarchuk

1920 births
1994 deaths
People from Kherson Oblast
Communist Party of the Soviet Union members
Gerasimov Institute of Cinematography alumni
Academic staff of the Gerasimov Institute of Cinematography
Sergei
 
Directors of Best Foreign Language Film Academy Award winners
Chevaliers of the Légion d'honneur
Heroes of Socialist Labour
Honored Artists of the RSFSR
People's Artists of the USSR
Stalin Prize winners
Lenin Prize winners
Recipients of the Order of Friendship of Peoples
Recipients of the Order of Lenin
Recipients of the Order of the Red Banner of Labour
Recipients of the Shevchenko National Prize
Recipients of the USSR State Prize
Recipients of the Vasilyev Brothers State Prize of the RSFSR
Male Shakespearean actors
Ukrainian Soviet Socialist Republic people
Russian film directors
Russian male film actors
Russian male voice actors
20th-century Russian screenwriters
Male screenwriters
20th-century Russian male writers
Soviet film directors
Soviet male film actors
Soviet male voice actors
Soviet military personnel of World War II from Ukraine
Soviet screenwriters
Ukrainian film directors
Ukrainian male film actors
Ukrainian screenwriters
Ukrainian male voice actors
Burials at Novodevichy Cemetery